Mandalong is a small rural town in the City of Lake Macquarie in New South Wales, Australia, located near the town of Morisset and west of Lake Macquarie.

The Aboriginal people the Awabakal were the first people in this area. It was settled by Europeans in 1852 or earlier. Early industries were farming and timber working.

Today Mandalong is a quiet rural area. It is close to the Sydney-Newcastle Freeway and the Watagan Mountains. The nearest shops and railway station are in Morisset.

References

External links
 History of Mandalong

Suburbs of Lake Macquarie